Francis Xavier Hernandez (born August 16, 1965) is an American college baseball coach and former Major League Baseball pitcher. He played college baseball at University of Southwestern Louisiana from 1984 to 1986 before pitching in the major leagues, primarily as a relief pitcher, from 1989 to 1998. He returned to coach in the professional ranks in the Tampa Bay Rays minor league system from 2002 to 2010, as the pitching coach for the Charleston RiverDogs (2002-2004), Montgomery Biscuits (2005-2006) and Durham Bulls (2007-2010).

Amateur career

Hernandez played high school baseball at Thomas Jefferson High School in Port Arthur, Texas, where he led the Yellow Jackets to a 5-A State Title in 1983 with a 19-1 W/L record and was named the Texas High School Player of the Year. He attended and pitched for the University of Southwestern Louisiana (University of Louisiana-Lafayette) Ragin Cajuns. In 1985, he played collegiate summer baseball for the Orleans Cardinals of the Cape Cod Baseball League. He was selected by the Toronto Blue Jays in the 4th round of the 1986 MLB Draft.

Professional career
Hernandez pitched in the Major Leagues for the Blue Jays (1989), Houston Astros (1990–1993 and 1996), New York Yankees (1994), Cincinnati Reds (1995–1996) and Texas Rangers (1997–1998). He posted a career 40-35 record with 35 saves and a 3.90 ERA.  His best year came with the Houston Astros in 1992 when he posted a 9-1 record with 7 saves and a 2.11 ERA.

References

External links
, or Retrosheet, or Pelota Binaria (Venezuelan Winter League)

1965 births
Living people
American baseball players of Mexican descent
American expatriate baseball players in Canada
Baseball players from Texas
Cardenales de Lara players
American expatriate baseball players in Venezuela
Cincinnati Reds players
Houston Astros players
Knoxville Blue Jays players
Louisiana Ragin' Cajuns baseball players
Major League Baseball pitchers
Myrtle Beach Blue Jays players
New York Yankees players
Oklahoma RedHawks players
Orleans Firebirds players
Sportspeople from Port Arthur, Texas
St. Catharines Blue Jays players
Syracuse Chiefs players
Texas Rangers players
Toronto Blue Jays players
Tucson Toros players
Tulsa Drillers players
Houston Christian Huskies baseball coaches